A Gold code, also known as Gold sequence, is a type of binary sequence, used in telecommunication (CDMA) and satellite navigation (GPS). Gold codes are named after Robert Gold. Gold codes have bounded small cross-correlations within a set, which is useful when multiple devices are broadcasting in the same frequency range.  A set of Gold code sequences consists of 2n + 1 sequences each one with a period of 2n − 1.

A set of Gold codes can be generated with the following steps.  Pick two maximum length sequences of the same length 2n − 1 such that their absolute cross-correlation is less than or equal to 2(n+2)/2, where n is the size of the linear-feedback shift register used to generate the maximum length sequence (Gold '67).  The set of the 2n − 1 exclusive-ors of the two sequences in their various phases (i.e. translated into all relative positions) together with the two maximum length sequences form a set of 2n + 1  Gold code sequences.  The highest absolute cross-correlation in this set of codes is 2(n+2)/2 + 1 for even n and 2(n+1)/2 + 1 for odd n.

The exclusive or of two different Gold codes from the same set is another Gold code in some phase.

Within a set of Gold codes about half of the codes are balancedthe number of ones and zeros differs by only one.

Gold codes are used in GPS. The GPS C/A ranging codes are Gold codes of period 1,023.

See also
Hadamard code
JPL code
Kasami code
Zadoff–Chu sequence
Complementary sequences
Space Network – a NASA system that uses Gold codes

References

Further reading
 
  (xii+201+1 pages)
  (xiv+225 pages)

Line codes

de:Linear rückgekoppeltes Schieberegister#Gold-Folgen